Medea (or) is a comune (municipality) in the Province of Gorizia in the Italian region Friuli-Venezia Giulia, located about  northwest of Trieste and about  west of Gorizia.

The municipality of Medea contains the frazioni (subdivisions, mainly villages and hamlets) Ara Pacis, Monte di Medea, and Sant’Antonio.

Medea borders the following municipalities: Chiopris-Viscone, Cormons, Mariano del Friuli, Romans d'Isonzo, San Vito al Torre.

Demographic evolution

References

Cities and towns in Friuli-Venezia Giulia